The following is a list of radio stations in the United States that are authorized to run 50 kW (50,000 watts) of power. This is the highest power authorized to any AM station in the United States.

References

50 kW